Valerianella muricata is a species of plants in the family Caprifoliaceae.

Sources

References 

muricata
Flora of Malta